The Becker Hawks football program represented Becker College in college football. They were football-only members of Commonwealth Coast Conference. The college closed in 2021 due to financial woes from the COVID-19 pandemic.

References

External links
 

 
American football teams established in 2005
2005 establishments in Massachusetts
2019 disestablishments in Massachusetts
American football teams disestablished in 2019